Richard Plantagenet may refer to any Richard who was a descendant of Geoffrey Plantagenet, Count of Anjou:    

Richard I of England (1157–1199), also known as Richard the Lionheart, third son of King Henry II of England
Richard, 1st Earl of Cornwall (1209–1272), second son of John of England and younger brother of Henry III of England
Richard II of England (1367–1400), son of Edward, the Black Prince
 Richard Plantagenet, of York, of Conisburgh, 3rd Earl of Cambridge (1385-1415), father of Richard Plantagenet, 3rd Duke of York.
Richard Plantagenet, 3rd Duke of York (1411–1460), father of Edward IV and Richard III of England
Richard III of England (1452–1485), the last Plantagenet king.
Richard Plantagenet (Richard of Eastwell) (1469–1550), possible illegitimate son of Richard III of England
Richard of Shrewsbury, 1st Duke of York (1473–1483), second son of Edward IV of England and younger brother of Edward V of England
His imposter, Perkin Warbeck (1474-1499)
Richard Plantagenet (1476–1477), youngest child of George Plantagenet, 1st Duke of Clarence
Richard Plantagenet Temple-Nugent-Brydges-Chandos-Grenville, 2nd Duke of Buckingham and Chandos (1797-1861), politician.
Richard Plantagenet Campbell Temple-Nugent-Brydges-Chandos-Grenville, 3rd Duke of Buckingham and Chandos (1823-1889), politician and son of the 2nd Duke.